Alexandre de Oliveira Cavalcanti (born 27 December 1996) is a Portuguese handballer for HBC Nantes and the Portuguese national team.

He represented Portugal at the 2020 European Men's Handball Championship.

Honours
Benfica
Portuguese Cup: 2015–16, 2017–18
Portuguese Super Cup: 2016–17, 2018–19

References

External links

Living people
1996 births
Portuguese male handball players
Sportspeople from Almada
Expatriate handball players
Portuguese expatriate sportspeople in France
S.L. Benfica handball players